The 1975 Arkansas Razorbacks football team represented the University of Arkansas in the Southwest Conference (SWC) during the 1975 NCAA Division I football season. In their 18th year under head coach Frank Broyles, the Razorbacks compiled a 10–2 record (6–1 against SWC opponents), finished in a three-way tie for first place in the SWC, and outscored their opponents by a combined total of 336 to 123. The Razorbacks' only regular season losses were to Oklahoma State and Texas.  The team went on to defeat Georgia in the 1976 Cotton Bowl Classic by a 31-10 score and was ranked #7 in the final AP Poll.

Schedule

Roster

Game summaries

Baylor

SMU

Texas A&M

Source: Palm Beach Post

Cotton Bowl

References

Arkansas
Arkansas Razorbacks football seasons
Southwest Conference football champion seasons
Cotton Bowl Classic champion seasons
Arkansas Razorbacks football